Tago, officially the Municipality of Tago (Surigaonon: Lungsod nan Tago), is a 2nd class municipality in the province of Surigao del Sur, Philippines. According to the 2020 census, it has a population of 39,831 people.

History
The Municipality of Tago was born thrice because of the precariousness of political times back then. It saw the light of day for the first time in 1865 under the Maura Law of the Spanish Regime that lasted for three years.  Tago must have reverted to its barrio status because records had it that for the second time, it regained its municipal status on August 23, 1883, just after it transferred from the so-called Daan Lungsod (Old Town), which was perennially flooded, to the place called Laguna.  When the Philippine Revolution broke out in 1896, Tago was again reverted to its barrio status.

About the middle of the First World War, the people of Tago grew politically minded and in the summer of 1916, important leaders of then Barrio of Tago like Catalino Pareja, Calixtro Espinoza, Simon Luna, Miguel Montero, Juan L. Garcia, Feleciano Arquiza, Juan Pimentel, Lorenzo Elizalde, Canuto Consuegra, Lino Montero, Isidro Garcia, Pastor Cabrera, Bernardo Falcon, Felipe Lozada and Felix Rodrigues were determined to wrestle Tago's political independence away from the mother Municipality of Tandag.

This breed of local leaders then submitted a duly signed petition to the Municipal Council of Tandag. But wanting the petition to gain more support, Catalino Pareja, along with councilors Lino Montero, Isidro Garcia and Zacarias Espinoza, sent the resolution directly to the Provincial Board of Surigao which in turn endorsed it to the Governor General in Manila.

The crude transportation system during that time made the Provincial Governor Ricardo Gonzales incur delays in sending the petition to Governor General Francis Burton Harrison. But faced with numerous pressing matters to attend to, Harrison issued Executive Order No. 41 only on November 6, 1918, thus converting Tago, for the third time, from being a barrio to a newborn town.

Appointed Municipal President effective January 1, 1919, was then Councilor Catalino Pareja with Calixtro Espinoza as Vice Municipal President while Messrs. Feleciano Arquiza, Juan L. Garcia, Lorenzo Elizalde and Canuto Consuegra were appointed as Municipal Councilors.  On the same year, the first election was conducted and Catalino Pareja and Lino Montero were elected as Municipal President and Vice Municipal President respectively.

Reverend Father Nose Croonin was Tago's Parish Priest at that time.

During much of World War II Tago remained free from Japanese occupation. In late April 1944 the Japanese occupied Tago. The Japanese caused much damage there when their first patrol entered town. In early May guerrillas affiliated with the 10th Military District of the U.S. Army attacked the Japanese. Eight Japanese were killed, but the guerrillas were unable to dislodge them. The Japanese remained until 1945 and left many houses destroyed.

The Luna's, Elizalde, Falcon, Montero and Pimentel are the prominent family in Tago.

Geography
Tago is located in the central part of Surigao del Sur facing the Pacific Ocean. It lies between 126 degrees 12 minutes longitude and 9 degrees minutes north latitude. It is bounded on the north by the Capital Town of Tandag, on the north-west by Municipality of Lanuza, on the west by Municipality of San Miguel, on the southeast by the Municipality of Bayabas and on the south by the Municipalities of Cagwait and Marihatag.

Land area
Tago sits on a 343.52 km2 of land which is about 7.55% of the total area of Surigao del Sur. In terms of area, Barangay Cabangahan is the largest with 20% of Tago's land area while Barangay Purisima is the smallest with 1.51%.

Soil
Tago's soil types vary; along the shoreline is sandy. Barangays Victoria and Dayoan have Bantug clay; Barangays Gamut, Kinabigtasan, Sumo-Sumo, Adlay and Anahao Daan have Butuan clay; while Bajao, Alba, Cayale, Bangsud and Anahao Bag-o have silt loam.  Matho clay can be found in most of the mountain ranges from the seashore to the boundaries of Tandag-Tago and Tago-San Miguel.

Slope
Roughly 50% of Tago's land area is relatively flat terrain (0-3%) while roughly 30%, mostly in the north-western portion, are steep mountains.

Climate

Tago has a tropical rainforest climate (Af) with heavy to very heavy rainfall year-round and with extremely heavy rainfall in January.

Barangays
Tago is politically subdivided into 24 barangays.

Demographics

Tago recorded an average growth rate of 2.3% from 1980 to 1990.  But because of out-migration arising from lack of job opportunities, it had gone down to 1.86% between the periods 1995 and 2000. Among the barangays, Victoria registered the highest growth rate at 6.12% due to in-migration, the area being home to the Surigao del Sur Polytechnic State College while Barangay Mercedes posted a negative growth (-0.28%).

Population density
Population density is placed at 86 persons per km2. Barangay Purisima is the most densely populated with 1,137 persons per km2, higher than the municipal density.  Barangay Umbay has the lowest population density with 16 persons per km2.

Economy

Tourism

 Haguisan Kalipayan Hill - an eco-retreat resort and restaurant that offers dining, cottages and function rooms for events/weddings.
 Tago River
 Tago-La Paz Bridge
 Tago Plaza and Pagoda
 Tago Town Hall
 La Purisima Concepcion Parish Church
 Cagpangi Falls
 Green Falls
 Sola Gratia
 Villa Azarcon

Education
Fifty-seven per cent (57%) of Tagon-ons are elementary graduates, 25% are high school graduates.  Eighty-five per cent (85%) of them obtain college education but barely half of them hold academic degrees.

References

External links
 Tago Profile at PhilAtlas.com
 Tago Profile at the DTI Cities and Municipalities Competitive Index
 [ Philippine Standard Geographic Code]
 Philippine Census Information
 Local Governance Performance Management System

Municipalities of Surigao del Sur